USTA may refer to:

 United States Tennis Association
 United States Trademark Association, the former name of the International Trademark Association (INTA)
 United States Telecom Association
 United States Trotting Association, the head of harness racing in the United States.
 United States Tumbling & Trampoline Association

See also
 Usta (disambiguation)